Adoxosia nydiana is a species of moth of the subfamily Arctiinae. It is found in Brazil.

References

Moths described in 1929
Lithosiini
Moths of South America